The American Antiquarian Society (AAS), located in Worcester, Massachusetts, is both a learned society and a national research library of pre-twentieth-century American history and culture. Founded in 1812, it is the oldest historical society in the United States with a national focus. Its main building, known as Antiquarian Hall, is a U.S. National Historic Landmark in recognition of this legacy. The mission of the AAS is to collect, preserve and make available for study all printed records of what is now known as the United States of America. This includes materials from the first European settlement through the year 1876.

The AAS offers programs for professional scholars, pre-collegiate, undergraduate and graduate students, educators, professional artists, writers, genealogists, and the general public. 

The collections of the AAS contain over four million books, pamphlets, newspapers, periodicals, graphic arts materials and manuscripts. The Society is estimated to hold copies of two-thirds of the total books known to have been printed in what is now the United States from the establishment of the first press in 1640 through the year 1820; many of these volumes are exceedingly rare and a number of them are unique. Historic materials from all fifty U.S. states, most of Canada and the British West Indies are included in the AAS repository. One of the more famous volumes held by the Society is a copy of the first book printed in America, the Bay Psalm Book. AAS has one of the largest collections of newspapers printed in America through 1876, with more than two million issues in its collection. Its collections contain the first American women's magazine edited by a woman, The Humming Bird, or Herald of Taste.

History

On the initiative of Isaiah Thomas, the AAS was founded on October 24, 1812, through an act of the Massachusetts General Court. It was the third historical society established in America, and the first to be national in its scope. Isaiah Thomas started the collection with approximately 8,000 books from his personal library. The first library building was erected in 1820 in downtown Worcester, Massachusetts. In 1853, the Society moved its collections to a larger building at the corner of Highland Street, also in Worcester. This building was later abandoned and another new building was constructed.  Designed by Winslow, Bigelow & Wadsworth, the Georgian Revival building was completed in 1910 and stands on the corner of Park Avenue and Salisbury Street.  There have been several additions to this building to accommodate the growing collection. The most recent addition was completed in 2019 and created room for an updated HVAC system, conservation lab, and multi-use learning lab.  AAS was presented with the 2013 National Humanities Medal by President Obama in a ceremony at the White House.

History of printing
As part of AAS's mission as a learned society, it offers a variety of public lectures and seminars. One topic to which AAS dedicates significant academic energies is printing technology, especially in eighteenth-century British North America. Since Isaiah Thomas was a newspaper man himself, he collected a large number of printed materials. With regard to printing, paper making, edition setting, and reprinting, not much had changed in European technology by the eighteenth century. It was not until the late eighteenth century that paper-making material began to evolve from a hand-woven cloth to an industrial pulp. AAS undertakes special efforts to preserve printed records from this time period, as the Society maintains an on-site conservation department with various sewing, cloth, and binding materials to aid in the preservation process.

Past Leaders 
Over its two hundred year history, the Society has had 14 formal leaders who have shaped the organization's vision, collections, and day to day operations. Leadership roles at the AAS have historically overlapped in chronology, as different roles oversaw different aspects of the Society simultaneously.

Notable members

The American Antiquarian Society's membership includes scholars, writers, journalists, historians, artists, filmmakers, collectors, American presidents, and civic leaders. Notable members include the following individuals:

 Benjamin Abbot
 John Adams
 John Quincy Adams
 Herman Vandenburg Ames
 Roald Amundsen
 Edward M. Augustus, Jr.
 George Bancroft
 Alexander Graham Bell
 Ned Blackhawk
 Ken Burns
 Jimmy Carter
 Bruce Catton
 Harriette L. Chandler
 Ron Chernow
 Bill Clinton
 Calvin Coolidge
 Walter Cronkite
 Robert Darnton
 Drew Gilpin Faust
 Moses Fisk
 Esther Forbes
 Henry Louis Gates
 Doris Kearns Goodwin
 Annette Gordon-Reed
 Samuel Swett Green
 Ferdinand Rudolph Hassler
 Rutherford B. Hayes
 Washington Irving
 Andrew Jackson
 John Jay
 Thomas Jefferson
 Tobias Lear
 Jill Lepore
 James Madison
 Othniel Charles Marsh
 David McCullough
 James Monroe
  Pedro II of Brazil
 Nathaniel Philbrick
 Dorothy B. Porter
 John Wesley Powell
 Franklin Pierce Rice
 Franklin D. Roosevelt
 Theodore Roosevelt
 George Dudley Seymour
 James H. Salisbury
 William H. Taft
 Bushrod Washington
 Woodrow Wilson
 Gordon S. Wood

Awards
AAS was presented with the 2013 National Humanities Medal by President Obama in a ceremony at the White House.

See also

Books in the United States
History of books
List of antiquarian societies
List of National Historic Landmarks in Massachusetts
John Ratcliff
Massachusetts Historical Society
National Register of Historic Places listings in northwestern Worcester, Massachusetts

References

Further reading
 
 Gura, Philip F. The American Antiquarian Society, 1812–2012: A Bicentennial History (Worcester: American Antiquarian Society, 2012), 454 pp.
 Shipton, Clifford K. "The American Antiquarian Society." William and Mary Quarterly (1945): 164–172.
 Vail, R. W. G. "The American Antiquarian Society." Business History Review 7.6 (1933): 1–5.

External links
American Antiquarian Society Homepage
 Proceedings of the American Antiquarian Society. Worcester, Mass.: the Society, 1843–
 Common-Place free online scholarly history journal focused on early US Republic

 
Historical societies of the United States
National Historic Landmarks in Massachusetts
Historical societies in Massachusetts
Member organizations of the American Council of Learned Societies
Learned societies of the United States
Organizations based in Worcester, Massachusetts
Buildings and structures in Worcester, Massachusetts
Libraries on the National Register of Historic Places in Massachusetts
1812 establishments in Massachusetts
Libraries in Worcester, Massachusetts
Library buildings completed in 1820
Library buildings completed in 1910
National Register of Historic Places in Worcester, Massachusetts
National Humanities Medal recipients
Special collections libraries in the United States
Museums in Worcester, Massachusetts
Research libraries in the United States